Kevin Douglas Hoover (born May 3, 1955) is Professor of Economics and Philosophy at Duke University. He has previously held positions at the Federal Reserve Bank of San Francisco, University of Oxford (Balliol College, Nuffield College, and Lady Margaret Hall), and the University of California, Davis, where he served eight years as chair of the Economics Department.  Hoover is most noted for his work in the philosophy and methodology of economics with issues surrounding the modelling of causation. He has been the president of the History of Economics Society and chaired the International Network for Economic Method. He is the editor of the journal History of Political Economy and was (1996-2005) the editor of the Journal of Economic Methodology.

Selected publications

References

External links
Website at Duke University

1955 births
Living people
21st-century American economists
Alumni of Nuffield College, Oxford
Duke University faculty